Hatthikuchchi  Archaeological Museum (also known as Rajanganaya Museum) is one of the archaeological museums in Hatthikuchchi, Sri Lanka. The museum has been categorised as a site museum. It was built in 1990 at Tambutta, Mailewa area close to Haththikuchchi Vihara. Although today the museum has been established close to the Haththikuchchi Vihara premises. The museum is maintained by the Department of Archaeology of Sri Lanka.

The museum is used to exhibit archaeological objects found in Hatthikuchchi and surrounding area.

Opening hours 
The museum is open from 8.30 AM to 5.30 PM and close on Tuesday and on public holidays.

See also 
 List of museums in Sri Lanka
 Hatthikuchchi

References 

Museums in Kurunegala District